Elections to the Nagaland Legislative Assembly were held in November 1977 to elect members of the 60 constituencies in Nagaland, India. United Democratic Front won the majority of seats and Vizol Angami was appointed as the Chief Minister of Nagaland for his second term. The number of constituencies was set as 60 by the recommendation of the Delimitation Commission of India.

These were the first elections held in Nagaland after the Shillong Accord of 1975.

Result

Elected Members

See also
List of constituencies of the Nagaland Legislative Assembly
1977 elections in India

References

Nagaland
State Assembly elections in Nagaland
1977